|}

This is a list of electoral district results of the 1971 Western Australian election.

Results by Electoral district

Albany

Ascot

Avon

Balcatta

Belmont

Blackwood

Boulder-Dundas

Bunbury

Canning

Clontarf

Cockburn

Collie

Cottesloe

Dale

Darling Range

East Melville

Floreat

Fremantle

Gascoyne

Geraldton

Greenough

Kalgoorlie

Karrinyup

Katanning

Kimberley

Maylands

Melville

Merredin-Yilgarn

Mirrabooka

Moore

Mount Hawthorn

Mount Lawley

Mount Marshall

Murchison-Eyre

Murray

Narrogin

Nedlands

Northam

Perth

Pilbara

Roe

South Perth

Stirling

Subiaco

Swan

Toodyay

Vasse

Victoria Park

Warren

Wellington

Wembley

See also 

 1971 Western Australian state election
 Members of the Western Australian Legislative Assembly, 1971–1974
 Candidates of the Western Australian state election, 1971

References 

Results of Western Australian elections
1971 elections in Australia